CAPSTONE (Cislunar Autonomous Positioning System Technology Operations and Navigation Experiment) is a lunar orbiter that will test and verify the calculated orbital stability planned for the Lunar Gateway space station. The spacecraft is a 12-unit CubeSat that will also test a navigation system that will measure its position relative to NASA's Lunar Reconnaissance Orbiter (LRO) without relying on ground stations. It was launched on 28 June 2022, arrived in lunar orbit on 14 November 2022, and is scheduled to orbit for six months.

Background 
The Lunar Gateway is an in-development space station being planned by several national space agencies since at least 2018, including NASA, European Space Agency (ESA) and Canadian Space Agency (CSA). The Gateway is planned to be placed in a novel lunar orbit that has not been used previously, where it is expected to serve as a communications hub, science laboratory, short-term habitation module, and holding area for rovers and other robots. Gateway is slated to play a major role in NASA's Artemis program.

Computer simulations indicate that this particular orbit a near-rectilinear halo orbit (NRHO) offers long-term stability with low propellant requirements for orbital station-keeping, by using a precise balance point in the gravities of Earth and the Moon that offers a stable trajectory.

The main objective of the CAPSTONE mission is to verify the theoretical orbital stability simulations for the Gateway with an actual spacecraft. CAPSTONE will be the first spacecraft to operate in an NRHO. The spacecraft will also test a navigation system called Cislunar Autonomous Positioning System (CAPS), which will measure its position relative to NASA's Lunar Reconnaissance Orbiter (LRO) without relying on ground stations.

Spacecraft 
The orbiter is a 12-unit CubeSat. The US$13.7 million contract was awarded to a private company called Advanced Space, Boulder, Colorado, on 13 September 2019 through a federal Small Business Innovation Research (SBIR) contract. Advanced Space handled overall project management and some of the spacecraft's key technologies, including its CAPS positioning navigation system, while Tyvak Nano-Satellite Systems, Irvine, California, developed and built the spacecraft bus, and Stellar Exploration, Inc developed its propulsion systems that used Hydrazine.

Launch 

NASA announced on 14 February 2020 that CAPSTONE would be launched aboard a Rocket Lab Electron booster from the company's new launch site at the Mid-Atlantic Regional Spaceport (MARS), Wallops Island, in Virginia. The launch was scheduled for October 2021 but was subsequently delayed and moved to launch from Mahia, LC-1 in New Zealand.
The launch contract with Rocket Lab has a value of US$9.95 million, according to NASA.

Rocket Lab's new launch pad in Virginia, designated Launch Complex 2, was completed in 2019 and was hoped to be ready to support launches by 2021. The company said the new facility would principally support Electron missions with U.S. government payloads. However, certification of the Autonomous Flight Termination System (AFTS) took longer than anticipated, resulting in the launch site being changed to Mahia.

CAPSTONE launched on 28 June 2022. After separating from the second stage, the Rocket Lab's Photon kick stage lifted the orbital apogee into a lunar-transfer orbit over six days by firing the HyperCurie bipropellant engine at perigee six times followed by the trans-lunar injection (TLI) burn, after which the CAPSTONE spacecraft was deployed on its journey to the Moon.

On 5 July 2022, NASA lost contact with the spacecraft shortly after separation from Photon and stated their intention to recover two-way communication with the spacecraft and continue the mission.  On 6 July, mission operators re-established contact with the spacecraft. By 30 September, CAPSTONE was "power positive" and on a stable trajectory towards the Moon while the mission operators worked to regain orientation control of the spacecraft. The root cause of the problem was narrowed to a valve on a thruster that is probably partially open, which thus produces thrust whenever the propulsion system is pressurized. On 7 October, the team uploaded recovery commands, stopped the spin, and regained full 3-axis attitude control. It remained on track to insert into its targeted orbit.

Ballistic lunar transfer
CAPSTONE will use a ballistic transfer to the Moon instead of a more conventional direct Hohmann transfer. While trajectories of this type take much longer to reach their destination (about four months in this case, compared to about three days using a traditional direct transfer) they significantly reduce the propulsion requirements, which can increase the delivered mass (of the order of 10-15% more mass). After being ejected from Earth orbit by a series of burns of the Photon stage, the spacecraft will reach a distance of about 1.5 million kilometers, where perturbations from the Sun become important. It will then fall back towards the Earth, intercepting the Moon's orbit and finally entering the intended NRHO around the Moon on 13 November 2022.

Mission

See also 

 Artemis program
 List of missions to the Moon
 Lunar Gateway

References 

Lunar Gateway
Artemis program
Missions to the Moon
Spacecraft using halo orbits
CubeSats
NASA space probes
Space probes launched in 2022
Satellites orbiting the Moon